Jean-Claude Romer (Paris, 19 January 1933 – 8 May 2021) was a French actor, film critic, and film historian.

References

External links

1933 births
2021 deaths
Male actors from Paris
French film critics
French film historians
Writers from Paris